KIKR (1450 AM, branded as Sports Radio Beaumont) is a radio station serving the Beaumont/Port Arthur area with a sports format when it is in operation. It is under ownership of Cumulus Media, and normally simulcasts sister station KBED AM 1510 Nederland, Texas. Its studios are located on South Eleventh Street in Beaumont and its transmitter is located half a mile southeast of the studios.

History
KIKR received its license as KAYC on June 21, 1962 and was owned by Texas Coast Broadcasters, Inc. It was once the AM sister to KAYD 97.5 FM hence KAY-C and KAY-D.

1450 was originally licensed as KRIC in the 1940s. The FM, (then KRIC-FM) was originally 99.5 but was moved to 97.5 in a swap with Lake Charles, La due to the second harmonic of 99.5 falling in the middle of TV channel 11. At the time, there were no TV stations on in Beaumont and KHOU, then KGUL, was on the air with CBS from a tower north of Galveston island. Viewers in the Beaumont area trying to watch it could not, due to the interference. After numerous complaints were lodged, the FCC swapped 99.5 for 97.5 and the problem went away. KRIC-FM, now KFNC, is one of the oldest FMs in Texas on the current 88-108 MHz band.

In the 1962 - 1980, KAY-C was a Top 40 powerhouse with local legend Al Caldwell in the mornings, a variety of med-day personalities, and Paul King (Box) doing afternoons for 8 years. KAY-C carried AT40 with Casey Kasem along with Robert W Morgan's Special of the Week. Its main competitors were 1340 KOLE and 560 KLVI. In 1978, the FM, 97.5 KAYD flipped formats from Album Rock (AOR) to top40. The stations simulcast AT40, etc. on weekends but kept separate programming at other times. By the 1980s, top40 on KAYC was waning and the FM had gone to a country format. Eventually the callsign changed as Charlie Pride had bought the stations and they went Country. But FM had taken over the music airwaves and eventually 1450 became a Spanish station before finally becoming a sports radio station.

External links

IKR
Cumulus Media radio stations